Major 2nd (stylized as MAJOR 2nd) is a Japanese sports manga series written and illustrated by Takuya Mitsuda. It is a sequel to the original manga series Major. It has been serialized in Shogakukan's Weekly Shōnen Sunday since March 2015. An anime television series adaptation aired on NHK Educational TV from April to September 2018. A second season aired from April to November 2020.

Characters

Main characters

Position: Catcher

The eldest son of Goro Shigeno and captain of Fūrin Middle School's baseball club.

Position: Pitcher, Catcher

Toshiya's son and Daigo's teammate and rival.

Position: Pitcher, Outfielder

Daigo's classmate and vice-captain of Fūrin Middle School's baseball club.

Mifune Dolphins

Position: Pitcher

Daigo's teammate and Mifune's main and finest pitcher.

Position: Catcher

Daigo's teammate and Mifune's main and finest catcher.

Ōbi Middle School

Position: Pitcher

Ken's daughter and Wataru's twin sister. She is a southpaw pitcher.

Position: Catcher

Ken's son and Michiru's twin brother. He is a catcher.

Family Members

Gōrō's daughter and Daigo's older sister.

Fūrin Middle School

Position: Pitcher, Outfielder

Position: Shortstop

Position: Second Baseman

Position: Catcher, Outfielder

Position: Center Fielder

Daughter of Fujī, from the original Major series.

Position: Third Baseman

Position: First Baseman

Position: Pitcher

Media

Manga

Major 2nd, written and illustrated by Takuya Mitsuda, began in Shogakukan's Weekly Shōnen Sunday on March 11, 2015. In November 2018, the series was put on hiatus, and resumed its publication in April 2019. In October 2021, it was announced that the manga would enter an extended hiatus due to Mitsuda's poor physical health; the manga resumed publication on October 26, 2022. Shogakukan has collected its chapters into individual tankōbon volumes. The first volume was released on June 12, 2015. As of November 18, 2021, twenty-four volumes have been released.

Anime

In October 2017, an anime television series adaptation of Major 2nd was announced. It aired from April 7 to September 22, 2018 on NHK Educational TV. A second season with the same main cast and staff from the first season premiered on April 4, 2020. Episodes were delayed and rescheduled due to the ongoing COVID-19 pandemic. The season finished on November 7, 2020.

Crunchyroll streamed the series with English subtitles.

Reception
As of April 2018, the Major 2nd manga had 5.6 million copies in circulation, for the first 13 volumes.

References

External links
  
 Major 2nd official anime website at NHK 
  
  
 

Anime postponed due to the COVID-19 pandemic
Anime productions suspended due to the COVID-19 pandemic
Anime series based on manga
Baseball in anime and manga
Crunchyroll anime
NHK original programming
OLM, Inc.
Shogakukan manga
Shōnen manga